In telecommunications, a remote digital terminal (RDT) typically accepts E1, T1 or OC-3 digital lines to communicate with a telephone Access network (AN) or telephone exchange (Local Digital Switch, LDS) on one side, and forms a local exchange (LE) on the other, which is connected to "plain old telephone service" (POTS) lines.

See also 
 Distributed switching
 Remote concentrator
 Digital access carrier system

References

Local loop